Pope Innocent XI (16 May 1611 – 12 August 1689), born Benedetto Odescalchi, was head of the Catholic Church and ruler of the Papal States from 21 September 1676 to his death on August 12, 1689.

Political and religious tensions with Louis XIV of France were a constant preoccupation for Innocent XI. Within the Papal States, he lowered taxes, produced a surplus in the papal budget and repudiated nepotism within the Church. Innocent XI was frugal in his governance of the Papal States, his methods evident in matters ranging from his manner of dress to a wide range of standards of personal behavior consistent with his conception of Christian values. Once he was elected to the papacy, he applied himself to moral and administrative reform of the Roman Curia. He abolished sinecures and pushed for greater simplicity in preaching as well as greater reverence in worship, requesting this of both the clergy and faithful. In consideration of his diplomatic and financial support for efforts to free Hungary from Turkish domination, he is still widely referred to in the country as the "Saviour of Hungary".

After a difficult cause for canonization, starting in 1791, which caused considerable controversy over the years and which was stopped on several occasions, he was beatified in 1956 by Pope Pius XII.

Early life

Benedetto Odescalchi was born in Como on 16 May 1611, the son of a  nobleman  of Como, Livio Odescalchi, and his wife Paola Castelli Giovanelli from Gandino. The child's  siblings were Carlo, Lucrezia, Giulio Maria, Constantino, Nicola and Paolo. He also had several collateral descendants of note through his sister: her grandson Cardinal Baldassare Erba-Odescalchi, Cardinal Benedetto Erba Odescalchi, and Cardinal Carlo Odescalchi.

The Odescalchi, a family of minor nobility, were determined entrepreneurs. In 1619, Benedetto's brother founded in Genoa with his three uncles a bank  which quickly grew into a successful money-lending business. After completing his studies in grammar and letters, the 15-year-old Benedetto moved to Genoa to take part in the family business as an apprentice. Lucrative economic transactions were established with clients in the major Italian and European cities, such as Nuremberg, Milan, Kraków, and Rome.

In 1626 Benedetto's father died, and he began schooling in the humanities taught by the Jesuits at his local college, before transferring to Genoa. In 1630 he narrowly survived an outbreak of plague, which killed his mother.

Some time between 1632 and 1636, Benedetto decided to move to Rome and then Naples in order to study civil law. This led to his securing the offices of protonotary apostolic, president of the apostolic chamber, commissary of the Marco di Roma, and governor of Macerata; on 6 March 1645, Pope Innocent X (1644–55) made him Cardinal-Deacon with the deaconry of Santi Cosma e Damiano. He subsequently became legate to Ferrara. When he was sent to Ferrara in order to assist the people stricken with a severe famine, the Pope introduced him to the people of Ferrara as the "father of the poor".

In 1650, Odescalchi became bishop of Novara, in which capacity he spent all the revenues of his see to relieve the poor and sick in his diocese. He participated in the 1655 conclave. In 1656, with the pope's permission, he resigned as bishop of Novara in favor of his brother Giulio  and moved to Rome. While there he took a prominent part in the consultations of the various congregations of which he was a member. He participated in the 1669–70 conclave.

Papacy

Election

Odescalchi was a strong papal candidate after the death of Pope Clement IX (1667–69) in 1669, but the French government rejected him (using the now-abolished veto). After Pope Clement X (1670–76) died, Louis XIV of France (1643–1715) again intended to use his royal influence against Odescalchi's election. Instead, believing that the cardinals as well as the Roman people were of one mind in their desire to have Odescalchi as their Pope, Louis reluctantly instructed the French party cardinals to acquiesce in his candidacy.

On 21 September 1676, Odescalchi was chosen to be Clement X's successor and took the name of Innocent XI. He chose this name in honour of Pope Innocent X, who made him a cardinal in 1645. He was formally crowned as pontiff on 4 October 1676 by the protodeacon, Cardinal Francesco Maidalchini.

Reforming the administration of the papacy
Immediately upon his accession, Innocent XI turned all his efforts towards reducing the expenses of the Curia. He passed strict ordinances against nepotism among the cardinals. He lived very parsimoniously and exhorted the cardinals to do the same. In this manner he not only squared the annual deficit which at his accession had reached the sum of 170,000 scudi, but within a few years the papal income was even in excess of the expenditures. He lost no time in declaring and practically manifesting his zeal as a reformer of manners and a corrector of administrative abuses. Beginning with the clergy, he sought to raise the laity also to a higher moral standard of living. He closed all of the theaters in Rome (considered to be centers of vice and immorality) and famously brought a temporary halt to the flourishing traditions of Roman opera. In 1679 he publicly condemned sixty-five propositions, taken chiefly from the writings of Escobar, Suarez and other casuists (mostly Jesuit casuists, who had been heavily attacked by Pascal in his Provincial Letters) as propositiones laxorum moralistarum and forbade anyone to teach them under penalty of excommunication. He condemned in particular the most radical form of mental reservation (stricte mentalis) which authorised deception without an outright lie.

Personally not unfriendly to Miguel de Molinos, Innocent XI nevertheless yielded to the enormous pressure brought to bear upon him to confirm in 1687 the judgement of the inquisitors by which sixty-eight quietist propositions of Molinos were condemned as blasphemous and heretical.

Jewish relations
Innocent XI showed a degree of sensitivity in his dealings with the Jews within the Italian states. He compelled the city of Venice to release the Jewish prisoners taken by Francesco Morosini in 1685. He also discouraged compulsory baptisms which accordingly became less frequent under his pontificate, but he could not abolish the old practice altogether.

More controversially on 30 October 1682 he issued an edict by which all the money-lending activities carried out by the Roman Jews were to cease. Such a move would incidentally have financially benefitted his own brothers who played a dominant role in European money-lending. However, ultimately convinced that such a measure would cause much misery in destroying livelihoods, the enforcement of the edict was twice delayed.<ref>Isidore Singer, The Jewish Encyclopedia, Varda Books, 2003</ref>

Foreign relations

The Battle of Vienna

Innocent XI was an enthusiastic initiator of the Holy League which brought together the German Estates and King John III of Poland who in 1683 hastened to the relief of Vienna which was being besieged by the Turks. After the siege was raised, Innocent XI again spared no efforts to induce the Christian princes to lend a helping hand for the expulsion of the Turks from Hungary. He contributed millions of scudi to the Turkish war fund in Austria and Hungary and had the satisfaction of surviving the capture of Belgrade on 6 September 1688.

Pope-burning in London

During England's Exclusion Crisis (1679-1681), when Parliament sought to exclude the Catholic Duke of York from gaining the throne,
the radical Protestants of London's Green Ribbon Club regularly held mass processions culminating with burning "The Pope" in effigy. Evidently, the organizers of these events were unaware that the actual Pope in Rome was involved in a deep conflict with the King of France – and therefore, far from supporting the drive to get the Duke of York crowned, which served Louis XIV's political ambitions.

Relations with France

The pontificate of Innocent XI was marked by the struggle between the absolutism and hegemonic intentions of Louis XIV, and the primacy of the Catholic Church. As early as 1673, Louis had by his own power extended the right of the régale over the provinces of Languedoc, Guyenne, Provence, and Dauphiné, where it had previously not been exercised.

All the efforts of Innocent XI to induce Louis XIV to respect the rights and primacy of the Church proved useless. In 1682, the King convoked an assembly of the French clergy which adopted the four articles that became known as the Gallican Liberties. Innocent XI annulled the four articles on 11 April 1682, and refused his approbation to all future episcopal candidates who had taken part in the assembly.

To appease the Pope, Louis XIV began to act as a zealot of Catholicism. In 1685, he revoked the Edict of Nantes and inaugurated a persecution of French Huguenots. Innocent expressed displeasure at these drastic measures and continued to withhold his approbation from the episcopal candidates.

Innocent XI irritated the King still more that same year by abolishing the much abused right of asylum, by which foreign ambassadors in Rome had been able to harbor in embassies any criminal wanted by the papal court of justice. He notified the new French ambassador, Marquis de Lavardin, that he would not be recognised as ambassador in Rome unless he renounced this right, but Louis XIV would not give it up. At the head of an armed force of about 800 men Lavardin entered Rome in November 1687, and took forcible possession of his palace.

In January 1688, Innocent XI received the diplomatic mission which had been dispatched to France and the Holy See by Narai, the King of Siam, under Fr. Guy Tachard and Ok-khun Chamnan in order to establish relations.

Cologne controversy

The tension between the Pope and the King of France was increased by Innocent's procedure in filling the vacant archiepiscopal see of Cologne. The two candidates for the see were Cardinal Wilhelm Egon von Fürstenberg, then Bishop of Strasbourg, and Joseph Clement, a brother of Max Emanuel, Elector of Bavaria. The former was a willing tool in the hands of Louis XIV and his appointment as Archbishop and Prince-elector of Cologne would have implied French preponderance in north-western Germany.

Joseph Clement was not only the candidate of Emperor Leopold I (1658–1705) but of all European rulers, with the exception of the King of France and his supporter, King James II of England (1685–88). At the election, which took place on 19 July 1688, neither of the candidates received the required number of votes. The decision, therefore, fell to Innocent XI, who designated Joseph Clement as Archbishop and Elector of Cologne.

Louis XIV retaliated by taking possession of the papal territory of Avignon, imprisoning the papal nuncio and appealing to a general council. Nor did he conceal his intention to separate the French Church entirely from Rome. The Pope remained firm. The subsequent fall of James II in England destroyed French preponderance in Europe and soon after Innocent XI's death the struggle between Louis XIV and the papacy was settled in favour of the Church.

Innocent XI and William of Orange
Innocent XI dispatched Ferdinando d'Adda as nuncio to the Kingdom of England, the first representative of the Papacy to go to England for over a century. Even so, the Pope did not approve the imprudent manner in which James II attempted to restore Catholicism in England. He also repeatedly expressed his displeasure at the support which James II gave to the autocratic King Louis XIV in his measures against the Church. It is not surprising, therefore, that Innocent XI had less sympathy for James than for William of Orange and that he did not afford James help in his hour of trial. Innocent refused to appoint James II's choice as a Cardinal, Sir Edward Petre, 3rd Baronet.

Moral theology
Abortion
Innocent XI issued the papal bull Sanctissimus Dominus in 1679 to condemn 65 propositions that favored a liberal approach to doctrine which included two that related to abortion. He first condemned proposition 34 and countered that it was unlawful to procure abortion. He also condemned proposition 35, which stated: "It seems probable that the fetus (as long as it is in the uterus) lacks a rational soul and begins first to have one when it is born; and consequently it must be said that no abortion is a homicide."

Other activities
Innocent XI was no less intent on preserving the purity of faith and morals among all people. He insisted on thorough education and an exemplary lifestyle for all people and he passed strict rules in relation to the modesty of dress among Roman women. Furthermore, he put an end to the ever-increasing passion for gambling by suppressing the gambling houses at Rome. By a decree of 12 February 1679 he encouraged frequent and even daily reception of Holy Communion. On 4 March 1679, he condemned the proposition that "the precept of keeping Holy Days is not obligatory under pain of mortal sin, aside from scandal, if contempt is absent". In 1688, he reiterated a decree of Pope Sixtus V that banned women from singing on stage in all public theatres or opera houses.

Innocent XI was hostile towards the book Varia Opuscula Theologica (Various Theological Brochures) that the Spanish Jesuit Francisco Suárez published. He ordered all copies to be burnt in 1679 but his orders went ignored. One of the books was discovered in 2015.

 Consistories 

He elevated 43 new cardinals into the cardinalate in two consistories. In 1681 he named Antonio Pignatelli as a cardinal, who would later become Pope Innocent XII (taking his name in honor of the pope who elevated him). Innocent XI also intended to nominate his confessor Ludovico Marracci as a cardinal, but he declined the invitation.

 Beatifications and canonizations 
He also canonized two saints: Bernard of Menthon in 1681 and Pedro Armengol on 8 April 1687. He beatified six individuals.

Death and beatification

Final days and death
Innocent XI  is known to have suffered from kidney stones since 1682 and in 1689 his health declined notably. In June that year he was confined to his bed. For reasons of ill health, he cancelled a consistory of cardinals convoked for 19 June for the examination of bishops and he also cancelled meetings on 21 June. The pope was suddenly assailed by a strong fever on 25 June and on 29 June he was unable to celebrate the solemn Mass for the Feast of Saints Peter and Paul, deputing Cardinal Chigi to celebrate it in his place. The Pope's condition worsened on 2 July and his doctors were led to lance his left leg, which caused fluid release, and eventually to undertake an operation on his right leg on 31 July, and two more in the following two days.

On 9 August he received the Viaticum since doctors were of the opinion that he had little time left to live. On 11 August he received in audience Cardinal Leandro Colloredo, who came  to remind him that the pope had been set to raise ten men to the cardinalate but the pope refused to do so despite the cardinal's insistence. On the morning of 12 August he lost the ability to speak and suffered from breathing difficulties.

Innocent XI died on 12 August 1689 at 22:00 (Rome time)  Following his death, he was buried in St Peter's Basilica beneath his funeral monument near the Clementine Chapel, which his nephew, Prince Livio Odescalchi, commissioned.Cevetello, Joseph F.X., "Blessed Innocent XI," Homiletic & Pastoral Review. New York, NY: Joseph F. Wagner, Inc., 1957. Pp. 331–339. The monument, which was designed and sculpted by Pierre-Étienne Monnot, features the pope seated upon the throne above a sarcophagus with a base-relief showing the liberation of Vienna from the Turks by John III Sobieski, flanked by two allegorical figures representing Faith and Fortitude.Reardon, Wendy J. (2004), The Deaths of the Popes, Jefferson: McFarland & Company, Inc. P. 215.

In April 2011 the remains of Innocent XI were moved to make way for remains of the beatified John Paul II.

Beatification

The process of Innocent XI's beatification was introduced in 1691 by Pope Innocent XII who proclaimed him a Servant of God, and was continued by Clement XI and Clement XII, but French influence and the accusation of Jansenism caused it to be suspended in 1744 by Pope Benedict XIV. In the 20th century, it was reintroduced and Pope Pius XII proclaimed him venerable on 15 November 1955 and blessed on 7 October 1956.

Following his beatification, his sarcophagus was placed under the Altar of St. Sebastian in the basilica's Chapel of St. Sebastian, where it remained until 8 April 2011 when it was moved to make way for the remains of Pope John Paul II to be relocated to the basilica from the grotto beneath St. Peter's in honor of his beatification and in order to make his resting place more accessible to the public. Innocent's body was transferred to the basilica's Altar of Transfiguration, which is located near the Clementine Chapel and the entombed remains of Pope Gregory the Great (590–604). The altar is also across from Innocent XI's monument, which was his original site of burial before his beatification.

The feast day assigned to Innocent XI is 12 August, the date of his death. In the Hungarian calendar, it is commemorated on August 13.

Reports suggest that following the attacks on the United States of America on 9/11, the Church decided to advance the long-suspended cause of Innocent XI to be canonised, as the pope who had prevented the Turks from overrunning Christendom in 1683, thus drawing parallels with aggressive [[Islamism] (source?). However, popular revelations made in the novel Imprimatur damaged Innocent XI's reputation and thus the planned canonisation of Benedetto Odescalchi was suspended indefinitely.

It was believed that the canonization would have taken place in 2003 but the book's publication halted all plans to canonize Innocent XI.

Encyclicals
 Sollicitudo pastoralis (Fostering and Preserving the Orders of Men Religious)
 Coelestis Pastor'' (Condemning the errors of Molinos)

See also
 Cardinals created by Innocent XI
 Odescalchi

Notes

References

Acknowledgment

External links
 The Body of Innocent XI in St Peter's Basilica
 The Altar of Transfiguration
 Coelestis Pastor
 Video footage showing the beatification of Pope Innocent XI
 Innocent XI, 1611-1689 - The Lawyer-Pope 
 Diocese of Como

 
1611 births
1689 deaths
People from Como
Italian popes
Bishops of Novara
People of the Great Turkish War
Italian beatified people
Beatifications by Pope Pius XII
17th-century venerated Christians
17th-century popes
Popes
Beatified popes
Burials at St. Peter's Basilica